Tara Wheeler may refer to:
 Tara Wheeler (cricketer) (born 1999), Australian cricketer
 Tara Wheeler (Miss Virginia) (born 1984), American beauty pageant contestant and news anchor
 Tarah Wheeler (born 1979), American author